ARM Tormenta (A-302) is a missile boat in the Mexican Navy.

Sa'ar 4.5-class missile boats
Ships built in Israel
1981 ships
Sa'ar 4.5-class missile boats of the Mexican Navy
Missile boats of Mexico